Gallow Hill is one of the hills of the Sidlaw range in South East Perthshire, Scotland. At . Gallow Hill is located near Newbigging and is smaller than Craigowl Hill.

References

Mountains and hills of Angus, Scotland